Tonto Village is a census-designated place (CDP) in Gila County, Arizona, United States. The population was 256 at the 2010 United States Census.

Geography
Tonto Village is located in northern Gila County in Thompson Draw, a valley south of the Mogollon Rim.

It includes one restaurant. The charter school and church that were previously listed have since closed. The Fire Control road that runs through the village is the sole point of access to the Diamond Point Fire Tower.

Demographics

References

Census-designated places in Gila County, Arizona
Census-designated places in Arizona